The inca was a unit of currency in Peru between 1881 and 1882. The inca was issued in banknote form only and was subdivided into 10 reales de inca or 100 centavos de inca. It was replaced by the Peruvian sol at a rate of 1 inca = 10 soles. The banknotes were withdrawn in 1882.

Banknotes
The inca appeared on two series of banknotes, one consisting of overprints on earlier notes, the other a regular issue. The overprinted denominations were 1 real de inca, surcharged on old 1 sol notes, 5 reales de inca, stamped on old 5 soles notes, and 100 centavos de inca (i.e., 1 inca), surcharged on old 100 soles notes. The regular issue of notes was in denominations of 1, 5 and 100 incas. Some of the regular issue 5 and 10 inca notes were later surcharged with their value in soles.

References

External links

Modern obsolete currencies
Inca
Economic history of Peru
1881 establishments in Peru
1882 disestablishments in South America
1881 in Peru
1882 in Peru